Jocara chrysoderas is a species of snout moth in the genus Jocara. It is found in Guyana.

References

Moths described in 1917
Jocara